Sanford House is a historic home located at Queensbury, Warren County, New York.  It was built about 1797 and is a formal, five-by-two-bay 2-story Federal-style house with Georgian-inspired details.  It is of post-and-beam construction with wide clapboard sheathing.  It features an elaborate center entrance porch with a second-story Palladian window.  It is located adjacent to the Asa Stower House.

It was added to the National Register of Historic Places in 1984.

References

Houses on the National Register of Historic Places in New York (state)
Federal architecture in New York (state)
Houses completed in 1797
Houses in Warren County, New York
National Register of Historic Places in Warren County, New York